Perrierodendron capuronii is a tree in the family Sarcolaenaceae. It is endemic to Madagascar. The specific epithet is for the French botanist René Capuron.

Description
Its chartaceous to subcoriaceous leaves are obovate in shape. The inflorescences bear one to seven flowers, each with five sepals and five petals.

Distribution and habitat
Perrierodendron capuronii is known only from the eastern regions of Sava, Alaotra-Mangoro and Atsinanana.

References

Sarcolaenaceae
Endemic flora of Madagascar
Trees of Madagascar
Plants described in 2000